RAF Kai Tak was a Royal Air Force (RAF) station in Hong Kong, based at Kai Tak Airport. It was opened in 1927 and used for seaplanes. The RAF flight operated a few land based aircraft as well as having spare aircraft for naval units.

History
From 1968 to 1978 it was used by various RAF helicopter units, as well as the Royal Hong Kong Auxiliary Air Force and Hong Kong Volunteer Defence Corps Air Unit. The RAF left Kai Tak and moved most other operations to Sek Kong Airfield.

From 1993 onwards the civilian Government Flying Service replaced the Royal Hong Kong Auxiliary Air Force at Kai Tak, thus ending the RAF presence at the airport.

The apron and the old NCO Mess areas were used by the Royal Hong Kong Police Force as the Police Driving School premises for a number of years until re-sited.

Non-military users
It was the main airfield in Hong Kong housing other non-military users:

 Far East Flying Training School founded in the 1920s - later changed its name to Far East Flying and Technical School.
 The Hong Kong Flying Club 1927
 Aero Club of Hong Kong 1962.
 offices of various airlines including:
 Cathay Pacific Airways
 Hong Kong Aircraft Engineering Company (HAECO)
 Hong Kong Polytechnic
 Hong Kong Aviation Club
 Heliservices (Hong Kong) Limited
 Macau Aerial Transport Company
 British Overseas Airways Corporation

Aircraft
During the Japanese occupation from 1941 to 1945, Japanese A6M Zero fighters were based at Kai Tak.

A list of British aircraft stationed there:

Squadrons

The Japanese were stationed at Kai Tak during World War II and extended the runway at the base.

A list of RAF units at Kai Tak:

Air Headquarters Hong Kong Communication Squadron RAF (12 September 1945 –   15 January 1947)
No. 132 Squadron RAF (15 September 1945 – 15 April 1946)
No. 209 Squadron RAF (17 September 1945 – 28 April 1946)
No. 681 Squadron RAF (27 September –  23 December 1945)
No. 200 Staging Post RAF (October 1945 – June 1946)
No. 1331 Wing RAF Regiment (xxx xxxx – May 1946)
No. 96 Squadron RAF (16 April –  1 June 1946)
No. 110 Squadron RAF (1 June 1946 – 15 September 1947)
Japan Force Communications Flight RAF (28 April 1946 –  xxx xxxx)?
No. 1430 (Flying Boat Transport) Flight RAF (5 August –  1 September 1946)
No. 88 Squadron RAF (1 September 1946 – 24 June 1951)
No. 1903 Air Observation Post Flight RAF, No. 656 Squadron RAF (15 July 1948 – 17 August 1949)
Royal Hong Kong Auxiliary Air Force (1 May 1949 – 1 April 1993)
No. 28 Squadron RAF (11 May 1949 – 1 May 1950; 7 October 1950 – 28 March 1951; 15 August – 5 December 1955; 14 June 1957 – 2 January 1967; 1 March 1968 – 17 May 1978; 1 November 1996 – 4 June 1997)
No. 80 Squadron RAF (20 August 1949 – 3 January 1950; 1 February – 7 March 1950; 28 April 1950 – 1 May 1955)
Hong Kong Auxiliary Flight RAF (October 1949 – 1 October 1950)
Hong Kong Auxiliary Squadron RAF (1 October 1950 – 24 November 1953)
Hong Kong Auxiliary Air Force Wing RAF (24 November 1953 –  xxx 1954)
Hong Kong Fighter Squadron RAF (24 November 1953 –  xxx 1954

RAF detachments
No. 215 Squadron RAF (October 1945 – February 1946)
No. 209 Squadron RAF April 1946 – January 1955)
No. 81 Squadron RAF (October 1947 – April 1958)
No. 205 Squadron RAF (September 1949 – March 1958)
No. 88 Squadron RAF (June 1951 – October 1954)
No. 60 Squadron RAF (July 1961 – May 1968)
No. 103 Squadron RAF (August 1963 – March 1969)
No. 110 Squadron RAF (January 1964 – March 1969)
No. 45 Squadron RAF (June 1965 – February 1970)

Kai Tak runway
Kai Tak's first runway was a grass strip and the first tarmac, an east–west runway, was 457 metres long in 1939. A series of extensions were added over the years:

1940s - 1,371 metres runway added by the Japanese
1956 - 2,194 metres north–south runway added
1970 - 2,541 metres
1975 - 3,358 metres
post 1975 - single asphalt runway 13/31 - 3,390 metres (or 11,122 feet)

Facilities
Hangar for aircraft at Choi Hung Road used to store Supermarine Spitfires.

Historic buildings

Several buildings of the former station remain. Three of them, built in 1934, are Grade I historic buildings: the Headquarters Building, the Officers Mess and an Annex Block.

 The former Headquarters Building is located at No. 50 Kwun Tong Road. It housed the Kai Tak Vietnamese Refugee Camp (啟德越南難民營) from 1979 to 1981, and was used for detaining Vietnamese refugees until 1997. It has been housing the Caritas Family Crisis Support Centre (明愛向晴軒) since 2002.
 The former Officers' Quarters Compound, which includes the RAF Officers' Mess and an Annex Block, is located at No. 51 Kwun Tong Road. It was handed over to the Government in 1978 and converted into a Detective Training School of the Hong Kong Police Force, and remained in use until 2001. It has later been refurbished as the new Kai Tak campus of Hong Kong Baptist University, housing its Academy of Visual Arts (視覺藝術院). Other remaining structures in the compound include a former barrack office, a squash court, an air-raid shelter, a dust bin store, a Nissen hut, a mini-range, a latrine block, basketball court and an incinerator. The restoration and adaptive reuse of the Officers' Mess received an Honourable Mention at the 2009 UNESCO Asia-Pacific Heritage Awards.
 The Gray Block (克拉克樓), located at No. 2 Kwun Tong Road, was built in 1973. It has been converted into the New Horizons Building (新秀大廈), used by Christian Action.

See also
List of airports in Hong Kong
Sha Tin Airfield
Shek Kong Airfield
List of former Royal Air Force stations
Hong Kong International Airport (located at Chek Lap Kok)
Kai Tak Airport (the former Hong Kong International Airport, closed since 1998)
Kai Tak Development
British Forces Overseas Hong Kong

References

Citations

Bibliography

External links

Crest Badge and Information of RAF Kai Tak
History of RAF
1979 picture of the buildings

Military installations established in 1927
Military of Hong Kong under British rule
Kai Tak
Kai Tak
Airports in Hong Kong
Military installations closed in 1993
World War II sites in Hong Kong
1927 establishments in Hong Kong
1993 disestablishments in Hong Kong